Panchakshari Hiremath (born 1933) is a writer and poet, short story writer, essayist, critic, translator, orator, editor and freedom fighter who writes in Kannada, Urdu and Hindi. In 2005, he won the Sahitya Akademi Prize for Translation.

Early life
Hiremath was born at Bisarahalli, Koppal District in Karnataka. He was involved in the freedom struggle of Hyderabad Karnataka. He worked as a professor in Karnataka University and Karnatak College, Dharwad. His first collection of poems appeared in 1959.

Hiremath is most famous as a poet. He is a opponent of division of Indian society on the basis of language. Hiremath opposed dividing the society on the basis of language. Some of Hiremath's own works have been translated into Hindi, Urdu, Malayalam, Tamil, Marathi, Nepali, English, Spanish, French and German.

Awards and honours
2013 Shri ChennaRenuka Basava Prashasti, Harkud Math, Basavakalyan, gold medal and cash award
2010 'Goenka Hindi Sahitya Sarswata Sammana' Awarded by Kamala Goenka Foundation, Bangalore
2005, Dr. Hiremath won the Kendra Sahitya Akademi Award for translating Qurratulain Hyder Urdu short stories Patjhar Ki Awaz to Kannada. The translated collection was titled Hemantha Ruthuvina Swaragalu. 
 During Nehru Centenary, Soviet Union awarded "Soviet Land Nehru Award"
1994 Karnataka Sahitya Academy Honorary Award
1997 Rajyotsava Award, Government of Karnataka 
1985 D.Litt. World University, Arizona. USA
2003, Hiremath won The Gorur Foundation Trust's award for Poetry.

Published works
Poetry
 Chaityakshi
 Nee Rudranagu
 Bayake Ee Manake (Prescribed as textbook by Dakshina Bharat Hindi Prachara Sabha, Chennai)
 Mitra Deshada Kavithegalu (Russian poems; received Soviet Land Nehru Award)
 Gaali Gandha
 Belakina Heppu Hakuva Tavaka
 Indhradhanussu (translation from Hindi)
 Manasi (Forty five poems of Rabindranath Tagore)
 Bayala Baninalli (translation from Hindi)(Awarded Moorusavirmath Literary Award)
 Ondu Mattu Ondu, Eradu (translation from Hindi)
 Aashe Tumbida Usirugalu (translation from Hindi)
 Bhooma (translation from Hindi)
 Aarambhava Maduve (Awarde Gorur Literary Award)
 Samagra Kavye – Volume 1
 Samagra Kavye – Volume 2 (500 poems translated from different languages)
 Keladi (Samagra Kavya – Volume 3) (5005 Muktakas)

Stories
 Ennaleka (Prescribes as textbook by Karnataka University, Dharward)
 Hematha Rutuvina Swaragalu (translation from Urdu. Kendra Sahitya Akademi Award 2005)
 Quratul Ein Hyder Avara Aida Kathegalu
 Kshitij
 Krishna Chandara Kathegalu
 Hennondu Madhupatre (Ten stories of Amrita Preetam)
 Ippattelu Urdu Kathegalu
 Kashmirada Hovu (translation from Urdu)
 Gulabi Hoovu (translation from Urdu)
 Desha – Videshada Kathegalu (stories from different nations and languages)

Novels
 Kappu Hottage (translation from Gujarati)
 Aaru Adi Bhoomi (Kannada translation of Abdus Samad's Urdu novel Do Gaz Zameen), included in The Hindu's Top 10 Books of the Week
 Magga Chellida Belaku (translation from Hindi)
 Nari (Kannada translation of Siyaram Sharan Gupta's Hindi novel)
 Kattaleyondige (translation from Hindi)
 Jaragavada Rani (translation from Urdu)
 Ivan- e- Ghazal (translation from Urdu)
 Borban Club (translation from Urdu)

Criticism/Essays
 Kavi – Kavya – Darshana
 Kavi – Kavya – Kalpane
 Kavi – Kavya – Chintana
 Kavi – Kavya – Vihara
 Kavindra Ravindraru
 Kasmirada Mahayogini Lalleswari
 Hadinaru Prabandhagalu
 Cheluvina Alegalu
 Urdu Sahitya-Ondu Parichaya
 Galib (translation from Urdu)
 Bhoodana
 Gnana Peetha Prasasti Vijeta Firaq Gorkhapuri
 R C Bhoosnurmath (Kavi, Kavya parichaya)

Chintana Sahitya
 Chintana – Chirantana
 Chintana – Deepti
 Manasa – 1 (translation from Hindi, Rajasthan Patrika, Jaipur)
 Manasa – 2 (translation from Hindi, Rajasthan Patrika, Jaipur)
 Manasa – 3 (translation from Hindi, Rajasthan Patrika, Jaipur)

Biography
 Hanagal Kumara Swamigalu
 Sri Vijaya Mahanta Shivayogigalu
 Punya Chittaru
 Linga Leela Lolaru
 Ghanamadavaru

History
 Mukti Kshetra Ulavi
 Puratana Lucknow (translation from Urdu, awarded Moorusavirmath Literary Award)

Religion and Philosophy
 Veershaiva Pradeep

Travelogue
 Bharata Darshana

Literary Letters
 Ee Baduku Bangara
 Enentha Madhuravee Baduku
 Atma Sakhi, Tumbu Hrudaya Battalanu

Children's literature
 Chocolate Mattu Itara Kathegalu
 Neeti Kathegalu
 Darodegarana Maga (translation from Hindi)
 Bharatada Arasaru Mattu Sri Samanyaara Kathegalu (translation from English)
 Eidaga (translation from Urdu)
 Surakhabada Garigalu
 Makkala Kathegalu

Dramas (Translations)
 Hattu Hindi Laghu Natakagalu
 Panchali Shapatha Mattu Itara Natakagalu (translation from Tamil and Malayalam)
 Mooru Panjabi Natakagalu
 Chitrangada Mattu Itara Natakgalu (translation of radio plays from Oriya, Hindia Bengali)
 Neeru Taruva Hadi Mattu Itara Natakagalu (translation from Urdu, Bengali)
 Anuvadita Kathegalu (collection of translated dramas)

Hindi
 Manjari (Poems, Features, Stories and Articles)

English
 Yuga Purusha, translation by Vijayalakshmi Wodeyar
 Swami Vijaya Mahantesh, translation by Dr. Basavaraj Naiker
 Ulavi- The Abode of salvation, translation by Prof.C.N Hiremath
 Waves of Love, translation by Dr. C.V. Venugopal
 Sing the Song of Life, translation by Dr. C.V. Venugopal

Edited
 Mani Mukura Prabhe
 Gavi Deepti (With others)
 Shivayoga
 Shivalinga Deepti
 Shiva Deva (with others)
 Padmashri (with others)
 Abhinava Renuka
 Gurukarunya
 Vibhuti
 Bhaveyavara Bhoodan
 Sarangadeva

References

Hiremath, Dr. Panchakshari
Hiremath, Dr. Panchakshari
Recipients of the Sahitya Akademi Award in Kannada
1933 births
Living people
Kannada people
Hiremath, Dr. Panchakshari
Writers from Karnataka
Recipients of the Sahitya Akademi Prize for Translation